Tucson Tiburons were an American soccer team, founded in 2003. The team was a member of the Men's Premier Soccer League (later renamed the National Premier Soccer League), the fourth tier of the American Soccer Pyramid, for just one season, after which the team folded.

They played their home games in the stadium at Mountain View High School in Tucson, Arizona.

Year-by-year

References

National Premier Soccer League teams
Defunct soccer clubs in Arizona
Sports in Tucson, Arizona
2003 establishments in Arizona
2004 disestablishments in Arizona
Association football clubs established in 2003
Association football clubs disestablished in 2004